Kelvin Roy is a New Zealand based musician and composer. With a background in jazz, and more recently, children's educational music. He has played in numerous groups including BlueStars, The Jews Brothers Band,  Nairobi Trio, Twin City Stompers and several Latin American-inspired bands. Born to a New Zealand father in Flint, Michigan, USA, Kelvin performed in popular funk and jazz bands across the United States, from the midwest to Louisiana, and California, before making New Zealand his home. Kelvin has recorded with Jews Brothers, BlueStars, Gyrotayshin, and in 1997 released a solo album entitled inner space under the label Martian Music. He followed this up with just can't stop.

The album received kudos from both US and New Zealand radio stations, and he went on to release the Times of Our Lives CD and single, which featured on the SmoothJazz.com playlist for over two years.

One of the albums Kelvin produced with BlueStars, Around the World of Music Live at the Loaded Hog, charted at number #1 on the local radio station KAFM in Grand Junction, Colorado and played on many CMJ Network stations in the USA. The Loaded Hog, the venue of the live recording, was a regular host to Kelvin and BlueStars for over three years. He also continued the BlueStars Band in Australia.

Back in New Zealand, he continues to release under the same label, Martian Music, and has focused much of his attention on music for children. His hit song ‘Countdown’ was nominated for Children's Song of the Year in 2012, and since 2008, Martian Music has released 13 albums of children's music, composed and performed by Kelvin Roy. The albums focus on a key theme (such as animals, conservation, activities and values) and emphasise everything from dance and movement to soothing sounds.  In 2016, he released the Overlap album with Nigel Gavin, which is middle eastern and New Zealand inspired jazz instrumental.  Album #20, scheduled to be released in 2020, lifts his strength in diversity ideal to yet another level.

Kelvin is a master of the particularly rare bass trumpet, or otherwise known as a marching valve trombone, and he also sings, plays keyboards, percussion and trombone.

Bibliography

In 2018, Kelvin Roy (under the name Kelvin Roy-Gapper) published his first book, Aphorisms: Gifted One-Liners, through publishers Austin Macauley.

Discography

 Growing Up in the New Clear Age*
 M001 InnerSpace
 M002 Just can't Stop
 M003 Times of Our Lives
 M004 Around the World of Music Live at the Loaded Hog
 M005 Animals
 M006 AquAnimals
 M007 AquAnimals 2
 M008 Grooving with the Animals
 M009 Endangered Downunder
 M010 Soothing Flora & Fauna
 M011 Jollytime
 M012 Holidays
 M013 Things we Love to Do
 M014 Amazing Animals
 M015  Overlap
 M017 Birds
 M018 Magic of Nature
 M019 Funny Animals

References

External links
Kelvin Roy - Official Home Page

Living people
New Zealand composers
Male composers
Year of birth missing (living people)
New Zealand writers